Kurixalus naso, also known as uphill tree frog, long-snouted treefrog, and Annandale's high altitude frog, is a species of frog in the family Rhacophoridae. It is found in northeastern India, southern Tibet, and Bhutan. A related but unnamed species is found in Myanmar and Yunnan (China). Furthermore, it is possible that Kurixalus yangi (Yunnan, Myanmar, and NE India) is a junior synonym of Kurixalus naso.

Description
The snout is noticeably pointed. The limbs have serrated dermal fringes. The chin and breast are granular. Dorsal coloration is generally brownish, mixed with dark markings. The ventral surface is shaded posteriorly with dark spots. The iris is golden. Males have a single, internal vocal sac.

Habitat and conservation
Breeding takes place in small, temporary water pools.

The overall population of Kurixalus naso is believed to be small. It is threatened by deforestation. It is present in two protected areas in northeastern India, Dihang-Dibang Biosphere Reserve and Mouling National Park.

References

naso
Amphibians of Bhutan
Frogs of China
Frogs of India
Fauna of Tibet
Taxa named by Nelson Annandale
Amphibians described in 1912
Taxonomy articles created by Polbot